Laren is a town and municipality in the province of North Holland, Netherlands. Located in the Gooi region, it is the oldest town in the area. Together with its neighbor Blaricum, Laren is one of the most affluent towns in the Netherlands.

Nationally, Laren is well known for its history as a late 19th-century art colony, preserved in the museum Singer Laren, its retirement home for elderly artists Rosa Spier Huis, as well as its wide array of shops. Laren is part of the Amsterdam metropolitan area, situated east of Amsterdam.

Government 

The municipal council of Laren consists of 15 seats, which since 2014 are divided as follows:

Demographics
In 2007, Laren had the following demographic data:

Birth rate: 7.29 per 1,000
Death rate: 17.94 per 1,000
NGR: -1.07% per year

In August 2017, there were 11,135 inhabitants in Laren. The municipality has a population density of 897/km2 (2,320/sq mi).

Notable residents

The arts 
 Anton Mauve (1838-1888), painter, Hague School & Laren School, lived in Laren 1886/1888
 Albert Neuhuys (1844-1914), painter Laren School
  (1885-1980) artist, illustrated H. G. Wells' books
 Maurits Cornelis Escher (1898–1972), graphic artist, illustrator and printmaker, lived in Rosa Spier Huis from 1970 
 Barthold Fles (1902–1989) a Dutch-American literary agent, author and translator; lived in Rosa Spier Huis from 1986
 Maarten Krabbé (1908 in Laren – 2005) a Dutch painter and art educator
 Hannie Lips (1924 – 2012 in Laren) a broadcaster and TV announcer 
 Roberto Vander (born 1950 in Laren) a Dutch-Chilean actor and singer
 Johnny de Mol (born 1979 in Laren) a Dutch actor and presenter
Saar de Swart (1861-1951) a Dutch sculptor

Public service 
 Maria Montessori (1870-1952) an Italian physician and education reformer, lived in Laren 1936/1939
 Mona Louise Parsons (1901–1976) a Canadian actress, nurse and member of an informal Dutch resistance network
 Gerard Croiset (1909 in Laren – 1980) a Dutch parapsychologist, psychometrist and psychic
 Jan van den Brink (1915 in Laren – 2006) a Dutch politician and businessman
 Henk Zanoli (1923 in Laren – 2015) a lawyer and member of the Dutch resistance in WWII
 Paul Joan George Kapteyn (born 1928 in Laren) a judge at the European Court of Justice
 Roelof Nelissen (1931–2019) a Dutch politician and businessman; lived in Laren
 Pim van Lommel (born 1943 in Laren) a Dutch cardiologist, author and researcher into near-death studies
 Elbert Roest (born 1954) a Dutch historian, politician, former teacher and former mayor of Laren

Sport 
 Willemien Aardenburg (born 1966 in Laren) a former Dutch field hockey player, team bronze medallist the 1988 Summer Olympics
 Marcel van der Westen (born 1976 in Laren) a retired Dutch hurdler
 Thomas Boerma (born 1981 in Laren) a field hockey player, competed at the 2008 Summer Olympics
 Jacobine Veenhoven (born 1984 in Laren) a Dutch female rower, team bronze medallist at the 2012 Summer Olympics

Gallery

References

External links

Official website

 
Municipalities of North Holland
Populated places in North Holland